The Bangwaketse (also known as the BaNgwaketse, or Ngwaketse) are one of the eight principal tribes in Botswana, and are ethnic Tswana. (The "Ba" or "Bo" prefix in African tribal names in southern Africa means "people of" or "people who speak". "Ma" means "person of".) Kanye is the original Bangwaketse village located in the Southern District settled in 1853, originally called Ntsweng Hill. The king of the tribe is King Malope II, son of Seepapitso IV. The Bangwaketse people live in the arid mountainous region of Southern Botswana mentioned in the book Cherub: Guardian Angel. It is bordered by Moshupa, Lobatse, and Jwaneng, and it is a 45-minute drive from Gaborone, the capital city of Botswana. The village is served by Kanye Airport.

A documentary on the Bangwaketse royal family was filmed in 2003–2005: "The Queen's Courtyard".

Ngwaketse Areas

Notable Bangwaketse 
Quett Masire – former President of Botswana
Archibald Mogwe – former Botswana foreign minister and former Ambassador.
Mpule Kwelagobe – is a Motswana political economist, philanthropist, model and beauty queen from Gaborone, Botswana who was crowned Miss Universe in May 1999 in Trinidad and Tobago.

See also

List of rulers of the Bangwaketse

References

External links 

 "Khunwana: A history of the Bangwaketse (Part XII)", Sunday Standard

Ethnic groups in Botswana
Southern District (Botswana)